De Ciancio (or de Ciancio) is a surname. Notable people with the surname include:

 Pedro de Ciancio (born 1938), Argentine footballer 
 Rodrigo De Ciancio (born 1995), Argentine footballer

See also
 Ciancio